Stove Creek is a stream in the U.S. state of South Dakota.

Stove Creek was named the fact stoves were stored near its mouth for shipment until the roads were passable.

See also
List of rivers of South Dakota

References

Rivers of Dewey County, South Dakota
Rivers of South Dakota